Leordeni is a commune in Argeș County, Muntenia, Romania. It is composed of fourteen villages: 
Baloteasca
Băila
Bântău
Budișteni
Ciolcești
Ciulnița
Cârciumărești
Cotu Malului
Glâmbocata
Glâmbocata-Deal
Glodu
Leordeni
Moara Mocanului
Schitu Scoicești

Natives
 Constantin Fântâneru

References

Communes in Argeș County
Localities in Muntenia